Berle-Kari (Berle-Kåre) was a viking chieftain who lived in ninth-century Norway. His home was at Berle (Old Norse: Berðla), in present-day Bremanger in Sogn og Fjordane county. Landnámabók names him as the son of Vemund, and brother of Skjoldolf, one of the early settlers of Iceland.

According to Egil's Saga, Kari was a berserker, and a comrade-at-arms of Ulf the Fearless (Úlfr inn óargi).. The saga also Kari's three offspring as: Olvir Hnufa, who became a skald in the court of Harald I of Norway, Eyvind Lambi, who became one of Harald's hersirs, and a daughter, Salbjorg, who married Kveldulf Bjalfason. Kveldulf being grandson of the elder Ulf.

Explanatory notes

References
Citations

Bibliography

Viking rulers
9th-century Norwegian people
9th-century Vikings
People from Bremanger